Pedro Miguel da Mota Roma (born 13 August 1970) is a Portuguese former footballer who played as a goalkeeper.

Having played with Académica for over 15 years, he later worked with his main club as a goalkeepers' coach.

Football career
Born in Pombal, Leiria District, Roma came up through the youth ranks of Académica de Coimbra. He made his professional debut for the club in 1991, after a spell at Associação Naval 1º de Maio in the lower leagues.

After two successful seasons, Primeira Liga giants S.L. Benfica bought Roma. However, he failed to make a single appearance for the Lisbon side, and was subsequently loaned to fellow top division team Gil Vicente FC, where he played sparingly.

After 1993–94, Roma returned to Académica, where he stayed for another two seasons. After a disappointing second year he was loaned out to F.C. Famalicão but, upon coming back to Coimbra, he made a record 147 appearances in a row for the Students, and was first choice for six consecutive seasons; after a brief loan spell at S.C. Braga in 2002, where he made only three appearances, he returned and remained the starter for the subsequent campaigns.

In June 2009, after having only appeared in two games during the season, Roma retired aged almost 39, and immediately became Académica's goalkeeper's coach. In the following years, in the same capacity, he worked with the Portugal national team (women, under-17s).

External links

1970 births
Living people
Portuguese footballers
Association football goalkeepers
Primeira Liga players
Liga Portugal 2 players
Associação Naval 1º de Maio players
Associação Académica de Coimbra – O.A.F. players
S.L. Benfica footballers
Gil Vicente F.C. players
F.C. Famalicão players
S.C. Braga players
Portugal under-21 international footballers
Sportspeople from Leiria District